The Head of a Philosopher is a fragment of a bronze sculpture, discovered in 1969 on a shipwreck in the Straits of Messina.  The wreck dates to the end of the fifth century.  The date of the Porticello bronze head is uncertain: Alain Pasquier dates it to c.460–440 BC, but Enrico Paribeni suggests the late fourth or early third century.  In order to reconcile this later date with the late-fifth century context of the shipwreck, it has been suggested that there were in fact two wrecks, one earlier and one later.  Brunilde Ridgway rejects this suggestion, noting that other bronze fragments found in the wreck, which apparently derive from the same original sculpture, are stylistically closer to the mid-fifth century BC.

It is part-damaged, lacking its laurel wreath, left eye and the hair on the back of its head, while the mangled fragments of a hand and a cloak were found with it, which has led to the head's identification as a philosopher. It is now held at the Museo Nazionale della Magna Grecia in Reggio.

The Head, which has been recently restored, is believed to portray a philosopher, possibly the Epicurean philosopher Charondas, or a poet like Hesiod.

References

Works cited

Further reading
Dafas, K. A., 2019. Greek Large-Scale Bronze Statuary: The Late Archaic and Classical Periods, Institute of Classical Studies, School of Advanced Study, University of London, Bulletin of the Institute of Classical Studies, Monograph, BICS Supplement 138 (London), pp. 130–133, pls 146–149.

5th-century BC Greek sculptures
Art of Magna Graecia
Ancient Greek bronze statues of the classical period